This is a list of properties and districts in Early County, Georgia that are listed on the National Register of Historic Places (NRHP).

Current listings

|}

References

Early
Buildings and structures in Early County, Georgia